Rodwell Chinyengetere (born 8 March 1988) is a Zimbabwean footballer who plays as a midfielder for CAPS United and the Zimbabwe national football team.

Club career
Chinyengetere moved abroad to play for South African side Baroka in 2019, only to be loaned back to Platinum in July 2019. He signed permanently for them in January 2021.

He joined CAPS United in 2022 after his contract with Platinum was not renewed.

References

External links

1988 births
Living people
Zimbabwean footballers
Zimbabwean expatriate footballers
Zimbabwe international footballers
Association football midfielders
Zimbabwe Saints F.C. players
Hwange Colliery F.C. players
F.C. Platinum players
Baroka F.C. players
CAPS United players
Zimbabwe Premier Soccer League players
South African Premier Division players
Zimbabwean expatriate sportspeople in South Africa
Expatriate soccer players in South Africa